A common year starting on Sunday is any non-leap year (i.e. a year with 365 days) that begins on Sunday, 1 January, and ends on Sunday, 31 December. Its dominical letter hence is A. The current year, 2023, is a common year starting on Sunday in the Gregorian calendar. The last such year was 2017 and the next one will be 2034 in the Gregorian calendar, or, likewise, 2018 and 2029 in the obsolete Julian calendar, see below for more.

Any common year that starts on Sunday, Monday or Tuesday has two Friday the 13ths: those two in this common year occur in January and October.  

In this common year, Martin Luther King Jr. Day is on January 16, Valentine's Day is on a Tuesday, Presidents Day is on February 20, Saint Patrick's Day is on a Friday, Memorial Day is on May 29, Juneteenth is on a Monday, U.S. Independence Day and Halloween are on a Tuesday, Labor Day is on September 4, Thanksgiving is on November 23, Columbus Day is on October 9, Election Day is on November 7, and Christmas is on a Monday.

Calendars

Applicable years

Gregorian Calendar 
In the (currently used) Gregorian calendar, alongside Monday, Wednesday, Friday or Saturday, the fourteen types of year (seven common, seven leap) repeat in a 400-year cycle (20871 weeks).  Forty-three common years per cycle or exactly 10.75% start on a Sunday. The 28-year sub-cycle only spans across century years divisible by 400, e.g. 1600, 2000, and 2400.

400 year cycle

century 1:  6, 17, 23, 34, 45, 51, 62, 73, 79, 90

century 2:  102, 113, 119, 130, 141, 147, 158, 169, 175, 186, 197

century 3:  209, 215, 226, 237, 243, 254, 265, 271, 282, 293, 299

century 4:  305, 311, 322, 333, 339, 350, 361, 367, 378, 389, 395

Julian Calendar 
In the now-obsolete Julian calendar, the fourteen types of year (seven common, seven leap) repeat in a 28-year cycle (1461 weeks). A leap year has two adjoining dominical letters (one for January and February and the other for March to December, as 29 February has no letter). This sequence occurs exactly once within a cycle, and every common letter thrice.

As the Julian calendar repeats after 28 years that means it will also repeat after 700 years, i.e. 25 cycles. The year's position in the cycle is given by the formula ((year + 8) mod 28) + 1). Years 11, 22 and 28 of the cycle are common years beginning on Sunday. 2017 is year 10 of the cycle. Approximately 10.71% of all years are common years beginning on Sunday.

References

Gregorian calendar
Julian calendar
Sunday